"You Gotta Love Someone" is a song by English musician Elton John, written by John along with Bernie Taupin and released as a single from the Days of Thunder soundtrack in October 1990. The single was also used to promote the Rocket Records 2-CD retrospective The Very Best of Elton John, issued largely in overseas markets excluding the United States, where the more expansive box set To Be Continued... was issued. 

Produced by Don Was, "You Gotta Love Someone" and the three other tracks that close Disc 4 of To Be Continued... (along with "Made For Me," "Easier To Walk Away" and "I Swear I Heard The Night Talking", the latter of which was released first as a B-side of the single in France), were all recorded in one take each (minus overdubs). The tracks were also purported to be selections for a possible studio album project that was later abandoned.

Chart performance
The single peaked at number 43 on the Billboard Hot 100 and spent five weeks at number one on the Adult Contemporary chart, his tenth such achievement there. In Canada, the song topped the RPM Top Singles chart for a week, becoming John's fourteenth number-one single in Canada.

Music video
The official music video for the song was directed by Andy Morahan. It is very similar overall to his 1993 video for Billy Joel's hit "The River of Dreams", with several elements from the earlier video (such as lighting, sets, locations, camera angles, tinting etc.) being re-used with very slight variations in the later one.

Track listings
CD single and 12-inch single
 "You Gotta Love Someone"
 "Medicine Man"
 "Medicine Man" (Elton John with Adamski)

7-inch double A-side
A. "You Gotta Love Someone"
AA. "Sacrifice"

7-inch single
A.  You Gotta Love Someone
B. Medicine Man

7-inch single (France)
A. You Gotta Love Someone
B. I Swear I Heard the Night Talking

Charts

Weekly charts

Year-end charts

References

External links
 Lyrics of this song
 

1990 songs
1990 singles
Elton John songs
MCA Records singles
Music videos directed by Andy Morahan
RPM Top Singles number-one singles
Song recordings produced by Don Was
Songs with music by Elton John
Songs with lyrics by Bernie Taupin